"Breathe" is a song by American rapper Fabolous, released as the lead single from third studio album, Real Talk (2004). The song reached number 10 on the US Billboard Hot 100 chart in November 2004 and became a top-40 hit in several countries worldwide.

Background
The song utilizes a sample of Supertramp's "Crime of the Century", with the latter taking 100 percent of the track's publishing. The single acquired two remixes; one featuring 50 Cent and Mase; another with Noztra. The music video features cameos by The Game, Just Blaze, J. D. Williams, and DJ Clue.

Legacy
Pitchfork Media named "Breathe" the number nine song of the year for 2004, stating "'Breathe' sounds like the track Fab was always meant to rap over." The song was also listed by Pitchfork Media as the 288th best song of the 2000s. Complex named it number 60 on best songs of the decade.

The Beastie Boys performed their song "So What'cha Want" over the beat of "Breathe" on Late Show with David Letterman in 2006.

Track listings

US 12-inch single
A1. "Breathe" (amended album version) – 5:20
A2. "Breathe" (instrumental) – 5:19
B1. "Breathe" (explicit album version) – 5:20
B2. "Breathe" (acappella) – 4:48

Australian CD single
 "Breathe" (radio edit)
 "It's Gangsta" (explicit version)
 "Breathe" (explicit version)

UK and European CD single
 "Breathe" (radio edit)
 "It's Gangsta" (explicit version)

UK 12-inch single
A1. "Breathe" (explicit version)
A2. "Breathe" (amended version)
B1. "Breathe" (instrumental version)
B2. "It's Gangsta" (explicit version)

Charts

Weekly charts

Year-end charts

Release history

References

2004 singles
2004 songs
Atlantic Records singles
Fabolous songs
Song recordings produced by Just Blaze
Songs written by Rick Davies
Songs written by Roger Hodgson